Sirous Dinmohammadi (born 2 July 1970 in Tabriz) is a retired Iranian football player.

Club career
He is most notably for playing for Tractor and Esteghlal.

Career statistics

International career
Dinmohammadi made 40 appearances for the Iran national football team and participated in the 1998 FIFA World Cup.

International goals

Honours
Esteghlal
 Iranian Football League: 2000–01
Hazfi Cup: 2001–02

References

External links

1970 births
Living people
Sportspeople from Tabriz
Iranian footballers
Iranian expatriate footballers
Iran international footballers
Association football midfielders
Expatriate footballers in Germany
Tractor S.C. players
Shahrdari Tabriz players
Esteghlal F.C. players
1. FSV Mainz 05 players
Pegah Gilan players
Persian Gulf Pro League players
2. Bundesliga players
1996 AFC Asian Cup players
1998 FIFA World Cup players
Iranian expatriate sportspeople in Germany
20th-century Iranian people